Maurice Auguste Régimbart (1852 in Evreux – 22 September 1907 in Evreux) was a French entomologist who specialised in Coleoptera, particularly Dytiscidae, Gyrinidae and Hydrophilidae.
Regimbart worked on expedition material collected mainly from French,
Italian and Belgian colonies.
He was a member of the Société entomologique de France.

Selected works 
1877. Recherches sur les organes copulateurs et sur les fonctions génitales dans le genre Dytiscus. Ann. Soc. Entomol. France 46:263-274 + pl. 6.
1878. Etude sur la classification des Dytiscides. Ann. Soc. Entomol. France 8:447-466.
1882. Essai monographique de la famille des Gyrinidae, pt. 1. Ann. Soc. Entomol. France (6 ser., vol. 2) 51:379-458 + 3 pls.
1883. Essai monographique de la famille des Gyrinidae, pt. 2. Ann. Soc. Entomol. France (6 ser., vol. 3) 52:121-190 + 5 pls.
1888. Descriptions de Dytiscides nouveaux de l'Amérique de Sud. Ann. Soc. Entomol. France 57:388-392.
1888. Viaggio di Leonardo Fea in Birmania e regioni vicine. Ann. Mus. Civ. Storia Nat. Genoa 26:609-623.
1889. Contributions à la faune indochinoise. 2. Hydrocanthares. Ann. Soc. Entomol. France 58:147-156.
1892. Insectes du Bengale Occidental. 16. Hydrocanthares. Ann. Soc. Entomol. Belg. 36:112-121.
1892. Viaggio di Lamberto Loria nella Papuasia orientale. iv. Haliplidae, Dytiscidae, et Gyrinidae. Ann. Mus. Civ. Storia Nat. Genoa 1892(2):978-997.
1894. Voyage de M. E. Simon dans l'Afrique australe (décembre-mars 1893). 1. Haliplidae, Dytiscidae and Gyrinidae. Ann. Soc. Entomol. France 63:227-240.
1895. Révision des Dytiscidae et Gyrinidae d'Afrique, Madagascar et îles voisines. En contribution à la faune entomologique du Congo. Mem. Soc. Entomol. Belg. 4:1-244.
1899. Révision des Dytiscidae de la région indo-sino-malaise. Ann. Soc. Entomol. France 68:186-367.
1902. Genera Insectorum ed. Wytsman, P., I. Gyrinidae. V. Vertemeol and L. Desmet, Brussels. 13 pp.
1903. Coléoptères aquatiques (Haliplidae, Dytiscidae, Gyrinidae et Hydrophilidae) recueillis dans le sud de Madagascar par M. Ch. Alluaud (juillet 1900-mai 1901). Ann. Soc. Entomol. France 72:1-51.
1906. Voyage de M. Ch. Alluaud dans l'Afrique Orientale: Dytiscidae, Gyrinidae, Hydrophilidae [includes Haliplidae]. Ann. Soc. Entomol. France 75:235-278.

Collection 
Regimbart's collection is in the Muséum national d'histoire naturelle in Paris.

References 
Constantin, R. 1992 Memorial des Coléopteristes Français. Bull. liaison Assoc. Col. reg. parisienne , Paris (Suppl. 14) : 1-92 78
Lhoste, J. 1987: Les entomologistes français. 1750–1950. INRA (Institut National de la Recherche Agronomique), Paris : 1-355 98

French entomologists
1852 births
1907 deaths